Tara Mines is a zinc and lead mine near Navan, County Meath, Ireland. Tara is an underground mine where the orebody lies between 50 and 900 metres below the surface in carbonate-hosted lead-zinc ore deposits.

The deposit was discovered in 1970 by Derek Michael Romer while working for Pat Hughes' Northgate Exploration. Development started in 1973 and production began in 1977. Tara Mine is operated by Boliden. It is the largest zinc mine in Europe and the eighth largest in the world producing 200,000 tonnes of zinc concentrate and 40,000 tonnes of lead concentrate annually.

The planning conditions for the Tara mines included:
 The mining site was to be screened by trees to reduce visual impact.
 Noise and air pollution were closely monitored.
 Large quantities of mining waste or tailings were carefully managed.
 Water used in the operation was purified before being released into the Blackwater River.

Broken ore is delivered to one of five underground crushers and reduced in size to less than 150mm before being carried by conveyor to a 3,600t capacity storage bin at the base of the production shaft. Skip loading and hoisting are automatic. Ore is supplied, at an hourly rate of 570 tonnes, to the surface coarse ore storage building, with a 30,000t capacity, known as the Tepee. The concentrates are shipped via Dublin Port to Boliden's smelters in Kokkola, Finland and Odda, Norway and to other smelters throughout Europe. Tara Mines is connected by railway to Drogheda via Navan, where daily loads of ore are sent to Dublin Port.

Due to low zinc prices, production was halted between 2001 and 2003. In 2009 production was again threatened as demand for zinc, used to galvanise steel for the car and construction industries, declined sharply due to the slowdown in the global economy.  Zinc and lead prices maintained their strength throughout 2011 due to continued demand from China and India.  Ore production from Tara Mines continued strongly throughout 2011.  A brand new Autogenous Grinding mill, which replaces large sections of the original crushing and grinding plant, became operational in October 2009.

References

External links
 Boliden Tara website

Lead mines in the Republic of Ireland
Navan
Underground mines in the Republic of Ireland
Zinc mines in the Republic of Ireland